La ilusión viaja en tranvía (English: Illusion Travels by Streetcar) is a 1954 Mexican film, written by Luis Alcoriza and directed by Luis Buñuel.

Plot
Two Mexican tram drivers are devastated that their favourite tram will be taken out of service.  The pair decide to take it for "one last spin" but end up driving it around Mexico City for a day and a night.

Cast
 Lilia Prado - Lupita
 Carlos Navarro - Juan Godínez 'Caireles'
 Fernando Soto - Tobías Hernández 'Tarrajas' 
 Agustín Isunza - Papá Pinillos
 Miguel Manzano - Don Manuel
 Guillermo Bravo Sosa - Don Braulio
 José Pidal - El Profesor
 Felipe Montoya - Jefe del taller
 Javier de la Parra - Pablo
 Paz Villegas - Doña Mechita
 Conchita Gentil Arcos - Pasajera con santo
 Diana Ochoa - Maestra del internado
 Víctor Alcocer

External links
 

1954 films
1954 comedy-drama films
Mexican comedy-drama films
Mexican black-and-white films
1950s Spanish-language films
Films set in Mexico City
Films directed by Luis Buñuel
1950s Mexican films